δ-Guaiene synthase (EC 4.2.3.93) is an enzyme with systematic name (2E,6E))-farnesyl-diphosphate diphosphate-lyase (cyclizing, δ-guaiene-forming). This enzyme catalyses the following chemical reaction

 (2E,6E)-farnesyl diphosphate  δ-guaiene + diphosphate

This enzyme requires Mg2+.

References

External links 
 

EC 4.2.3